Duacarí is a district of the Guácimo canton, in the Limón province of Costa Rica.

History 
Duacarí was created on 27 November 1980 by Decreto Ejecutivo 12091-G. Segregated from Río Jiménez.

Geography 
Duacarí has an area of  km2 and an elevation of  metres.

Locations
Villages (Poblados): Aguas Gatas, Carambola, Castaño, Esperanza, Fruta de Pan, Limbo, Zancudo

Demographics 

For the 2011 census, Duacarí had a population of  inhabitants.

Transportation

Road transportation 
The district is covered by the following road routes:
 National Route 248

References 

Districts of Limón Province
Populated places in Limón Province